Thornham may refer to:

England
Thornham, Greater Manchester
Thornham, Norfolk
Thornham Magna, Suffolk
Thornham Parva, Suffolk

South Africa
Thornham, Eastern Cape